Chas V. Vincent (born July 24, 1977) is a Republican State Senator in the Montana Legislature from District 1 representing Libby, Montana. He is a graduate of the University of Montana.

See also 
 Montana House of Representatives, District 2

References

1977 births
Living people
Loggers from Montana
Republican Party Montana state senators
University of Montana alumni
Politicians from Kalispell, Montana
People from Libby, Montana
21st-century American politicians